The 2022 United States House of Representatives elections in Texas were held on November 8, 2022, to elect the 38 U.S. representatives from Texas, one from each of the state's 38 congressional districts. The state gained two seats after the results of the 2020 Census. The elections coincided with other elections to the House of Representatives, other elections to the United States Senate, and various state and local elections. Primary elections took place on March 1, with primary runoffs scheduled for May 24 for districts where no candidate received over 50% of the vote.

Republicans had gained one seat in the House due to a special election in the 34th district seeing Mayra Flores succeed Filemon Vela and become the first Mexican-born congresswoman. During the 2022 elections, the Democrats and Republicans each gained one of the two seats Texas gained through reapportionment. While Republicans flipped the 15th district, Democrats flipped back the 34th district, and retained the 28th district, dashing Republican hopes of a red wave in the Rio Grande Valley. This resulted in a net gain of one seat for both parties.

Redistricting 

The Texas Legislature drew new maps for Texas' congressional districts to account for the two new congressional districts it gained through the 2020 Census. The Republican Party had a trifecta in the Texas Government at the time, giving them full control of the redistricting process. Legislators drew the maps for the state during a special session in Fall 2021. The maps that passed were widely criticized as racial and partisan gerrymanders designed to keep Republicans in power and reduce the voting power of minorities. News sources specifically noted that both of Texas' new congressional districts were majority white, despite voters of color making up 95% of the state's growth in the previous decade. 

Unlike before the 2012 elections, Texas' maps did not have to pass preclearance under Section 5 of the Voting Rights Act of 1965, as the Supreme Court had ruled preclearance unconstitutional through Shelby County v. Holder in 2013. Despite this, the Justice Department sued the state of Texas after the map's passage, arguing that they violated Section 2 of the Voting Rights Act.

Results summary

Statewide

District 1

The 1st district encompasses Tyler, Longview, and Texarkana. The incumbent is Republican Louie Gohmert, who has represented the district since 2004 and was reelected with 72.6% of the vote in 2020. On November 22, 2021, Gohmert announced that he would run for Texas Attorney General against incumbent Ken Paxton.

Republican primary

Candidates

Nominee
 Nathaniel Moran, Smith County judge

Eliminated in primary
Aditya Atholi, former oil rig worker
 Joe McDaniel II, businessman
 John Porro, physician

Declined
Louie Gohmert, incumbent U.S. Representative (ran for Texas Attorney General)
 Matt Schaefer, Texas State Representative

Endorsements

Primary results

Democratic primary

Candidates

Nominee
Jrmar Jefferson, investor

Eliminated in runoff
Victor Dunn, businessman

Eliminated in primary
Gavin Dass, teacher
Stephen Kocen, self-employed

Endorsements

Primary results

Primary runoff results

General election

Predictions

Results

District 2

The 2nd district encompasses The Woodlands, Spring, Kingwood, Humble, and Atascocita. The incumbent is Republican Dan Crenshaw, who has represented the district since 2019 and was reelected with 55.6% of the vote in 2020.

Republican primary
Incumbent Representative Dan Crenshaw, who had maintained a high profile since his election, faced three primary challengers. All three ran as more conservative alternatives to Crenshaw, criticizing him for his vote to certify the results of the 2020 presidential election.

Candidates

Nominee
Dan Crenshaw, incumbent U.S. Representative

Eliminated in primary
Jameson Ellis, marketing executive
Martin Etwop, Christian missionary
Milam Langella, pilot

Withdrew
Mike Billand
Brett Guillory, educator (switched to Texas's 38th congressional district)
Lucia Rodriguez

Declined
 Kevin Brady, U.S. Representative

Endorsements

Primary results

Democratic primary

Candidates

Nominee
Robin Fulford, stay-at-home mother

Withdrawn
Rayna Reid

Primary results

General election

Predictions

Results

District 3

The 3rd district encompasses much of Collin County and Hunt County. The incumbent is Republican Van Taylor, who has represented the district since 2019 and was reelected with 55.1% of the vote in 2020. On March 2, 2022, after being forced into a runoff, Taylor announced he would end his reelection campaign amid allegations of infidelity with a former jihadist. Former judge Keith Self became the Republican nominee following Taylor's withdrawal, canceling the runoff.

Republican primary

Candidates

Nominee
Keith Self, former Collin County Judge

Eliminated in primary
Suzanne Harp, sales executive
Jeremy Ivanovskis, flight attendant
Rickey Williams, educator

Withdrawn
Van Taylor, incumbent U.S. Representative

Endorsements

Primary results

Runoff results
The Republican primary runoff was canceled following Taylor's withdrawal. Self became the Republican nominee.

Democratic primary

Candidates

Nominee
Sandeep Srivastava, real estate agent and candidate for Plano City Council in 2021

Eliminated in primary
Doc Shelby, vice chairman of the Hunt County Democratic party (previously filed to run in Texas's 4th congressional district)

Endorsements

Primary results

General election

Predictions

Results

District 4

The 4th district encompasses counties along the Red River. The incumbent is Republican Pat Fallon, who has represented the district since 2021 and was elected with 75.1% of the vote in 2020.

Republican primary

Candidates

Nominee
 Pat Fallon, incumbent U.S. Representative

Eliminated in primary
 Dan Thomas, news anchor
 John Harper, Air Force veteran, former vice president at Texas A&M University–Commerce, and former mayor of Rowlett

Endorsements

Primary results

Democratic primary

Candidates

Nominee
Iro Omere, consultant

Withdrew
Earl Davis
Doc Shelby, vice chairman of the Hunt County Democratic party (running in Texas's 3rd congressional district)

Primary results

General election

Predictions

Results

District 5

The 5th district encompasses Mesquite, Anderson, Cherokee, Henderson, Van Zandt, and Kaufman. The incumbent is Republican Lance Gooden, who has represented the district since 2019 and was reelected with 62% of the vote in 2020.

Republican primary

Candidates

Nominee
 Lance Gooden, incumbent U.S. Representative

Endorsements

Primary results

Democratic primary

Candidates

Nominee
Tartisha Hill, community health worker and former Balch Springs city councillor

Eliminated in primary
Kathleen Bailey, former deputy assistant secretary for the Bureau of Intelligence and Research

Withdrew
Charles Gearing, attorney (running for the Texas House of Representatives)

Primary results

General election

Predictions

Results

District 6

The 6th district encompasses Ellis County and Palestine. The incumbent is Republican Jake Ellzey, who has represented the district since 2021 and was elected with 53.3% of the vote in 2021 after the previous incumbent, Ron Wright, died of complications from COVID-19 on February 7, 2021.

Republican primary

Candidates

Nominee
 Jake Ellzey, incumbent U.S. Representative

Eliminated in primary
 James Buford, maintenance supervisor
 Bill Payne, retired attorney

Endorsements

Primary results

General election

Predictions

Results

District 7

The 7th district encompasses the suburbs of Houston such as Gulfton and Alief. The incumbent is Democrat Lizzie Fletcher, who has represented the district since 2019 and was reelected with 50.8% of the vote in 2020.

Democratic primary

Candidates

Nominee
 Lizzie Fletcher, incumbent U.S. Representative

Endorsements

Primary results

Republican primary

Candidates

Nominee
Johnny Teague, pastor, rancher and author of The Lost Diary of Anne Frank

Eliminated in runoff
Tim Stroud, former combat medic

Eliminated in primary
Rudy Atencio, mediator conflict specialist
Tina Blum Cohen, actress and furniture company owner
Benson Gitau, businessman
Laique Rehman, entrepreneur
Lance Stewart, franchisee

Withdrew
Roland Lopez, business consultant (running in Texas's 38th congressional district)
Damien Mockus, gym owner (switched to run in Texas's 10th congressional district, now running in Texas's 38th congressional district)
Richard Welch, project manager (running in Texas's 38th congressional district)
Jafar Hajjar

Endorsements

Primary results

Primary runoff results

General election

Predictions

Results

District 8

The 8th district includes northern suburbs and exurbs of Houston such as Conroe and Willis. It was represented by Republican Kevin Brady, who retired, leaving the 8th as an open seat during the 2022 election.

Republican primary

Candidates

Nominee
Morgan Luttrell, businessman and retired Navy Seal

Eliminated in primary
Betsy Bates, surgical tech
Candice Burrows, businesswoman
Christian Collins, a former aide to Ted Cruz
Jonathan Hullihan, Navy JAG veteran and attorney
Dan McKaughan, pastor and U.S. Navy veteran
Jonathan Mitchell, pipeliner
Chuck Montgomery, comedian
Michael Philips, telecom executive
Jessica Wellington, a former congressional aide
Taylor Whichard, Willis public works director

Withdrew
Rudy Atencio (running in Texas's 7th congressional district)
Martin Etwop, Christian missionary (running in Texas's 2nd congressional district)
Jerry Ford Sr., fire chief and business owner (running in Texas's 38th congressional district)
Salvador Gallegos
Ryan Jarchow (endorsed Hullihan)
Adrian Kaiser
Christopher Revis

Endorsements

Primary results

Democratic primary

Candidates

Nominee
Laura Jones, chair of the San Jacinto County Democratic Party

Primary results

General election

Predictions

Results

District 9

The 9th district encompasses the southern Houston suburbs such as Missouri City. The incumbent is Democrat Al Green, who was reelected with 75.5% of the vote in 2020.

Democratic primary

Candidates

Nominee
 Al Green, incumbent U.S. Representative

Endorsements

Results

Republican primary

Candidates

Nominee
Jimmy Leon, educator

Results

General election

Predictions

Results

District 10

The 10th district stretches from northwestern Austin to Bryan–College Station. The incumbent is Republican Michael McCaul, who was reelected in 2020 with 52.6% of the vote.

Republican primary

Candidates

Nominee
 Michael McCaul, incumbent U.S. Representative

Withdrew
Damien Mockus, gym owner (previously filed to run in Texas's 7th congressional district, now running in Texas's 38th congressional district)

Endorsements

Results

Democratic primary

Candidates

Nominee
Linda Nuno, healthcare worker

Withdrew
Larry Wallace Jr., mayor of Manor

Endorsements

Results

General election

Predictions

Results

District 11

The 11th district is based in midwestern Texas, including Lamesa, Midland, Odessa, San Angelo, Granbury, and Brownwood. The incumbent is Republican August Pfluger, who was elected with 79.7% of the vote in 2020.

Republican primary

Candidates

Nominee
August Pfluger, incumbent U.S. Representative

Endorsements

Results

General election

Predictions

Results

District 12

The 12th district is in the Dallas–Fort Worth metroplex, and takes in Parker County and western Tarrant County, including parts of Fort Worth and its inner suburbs of North Richland Hills, Saginaw, and Haltom City. The incumbent is Republican Kay Granger, who was reelected with 63.7% of the vote in 2020.

Republican primary

Candidates

Nominee
Kay Granger, incumbent U.S. Representative

Eliminated in primary
Ryan Catala, public school administrator
Alysia Rieg, EMT

Withdrew
Chris Putnam
Chris Rector (running for the Texas House of Representatives as a Democrat)

Endorsements

Results

Democratic primary

Candidates

Nominee
Trey Hunt, social worker

Endorsements

Results

General election

Predictions

Results

District 13

The 13th district encompasses most of the Texas Panhandle, containing the cities of Amarillo, Gainesville and Wichita Falls, as well as northern Denton County. The incumbent is Republican Ronny Jackson, who was elected with 79.4% of the vote in 2020.

Republican primary

Candidates

Nominee
 Ronny Jackson, incumbent U.S. representative

Endorsements

Results

Democratic primary

Candidates

Nominee
Kathleen Brown, attorney

Declined
Gus Trujillo, office manager and nominee for Texas's 13th congressional district in 2020

Endorsements

Results

General election

Predictions

Results

District 14

The 14th district takes in the southern and southeastern region of Greater Houston, including Galveston, Jefferson County and southern Brazoria County. The incumbent is Republican Randy Weber, who was reelected with 61.6% of the vote in 2020.

Republican primary

Candidates

Nominee
 Randy Weber, incumbent U.S. representative

Eliminated in primary
Keith Casey, accountant and perennial candidate
Ruben Landon Dante, actor

Endorsements

Results

Democratic primary

Candidates

Nominee
Mikal Williams, attorney

Eliminated in primary
Eugene Howard, educator

Results

General election

Predictions

Results
Official sources list Williams as having received 63,606 votes, but a reporting error from Galveston County undercounted his vote total by 5,000 votes.

District 15

The 15th district stretches from western Hidalgo County in the Rio Grande Valley, northward into rural counties in the Greater San Antonio area. The incumbent was Democrat Vicente Gonzalez, who was reelected with 50.5% of the vote in 2020. On October 26, 2021, Gonzalez announced that he would run for election in the neighboring 34th district, while still serving District 15 until 2023. The district was also significant as, despite its historical Democratic lean, Donald Trump came within two points of winning it in 2020, and the newly drawn 15th is even more Republican than its predecessor.

This district was included on the list of Democratic-held seats that the National Republican Congressional Committee was targeting in 2022.

Democratic primary

Candidates

Nominee
Michelle Vallejo, businesswoman

Eliminated in runoff
Ruben Ramirez, U.S. Army veteran, trial attorney, and candidate for this seat in 2016

Eliminated in primary
Eliza Alvarado, former employee for the United States Department of Labor (endorsed Vallejo in runoff)
Julio Garza, activist (endorsed Vallejo in general)
John Rigney, attorney (endorsed Vallejo in runoff)
Vanessa Tijerina, nurse

Declined
 Vicente Gonzalez, incumbent U.S. Representative (running in Texas's 34th congressional district)

Endorsements

Results

Primary runoff

Polling

Results

Republican primary

Candidates

Nominee
Monica De La Cruz, insurance agent and nominee for this seat in 2020

Eliminated in primary
Sara Canady, Wilson County Justice of the Peace
Aizar Cavazos, retired U.S. Border Patrol agent
Vangela Churchill, high school assistant principal
Mauro Garza, nightclub owner and nominee for Texas's 20th congressional district in 2020
Angela Juarez, self-employed
Ryan Krause, pastor and candidate for this seat in 2020
John Lerma, retiree
Steve Schmuker, college professor

Withdrew
Frank McCaffrey, former broadcast journalist (running in Texas's 34th congressional district)

Endorsements

Results

General election

Predictions

Polling

Results

District 16

The 16th district is entirely within El Paso County, taking in El Paso, Horizon City, and Anthony. The incumbent is Democrat Veronica Escobar, who was reelected with 64.7% of the vote in 2020.

Democratic primary

Candidates

Nominee
Veronica Escobar, incumbent U.S. Representative

Eliminated in primary
Deliris Montanez Berrios, retired medical worker

Endorsements

Results

Republican primary

Candidates

Nominee
Irene Armendariz-Jackson, realtor and nominee for this seat in 2020

Withdrew
Samuel Williams Jr, candidate for this seat in 2020

Results

General election

Endorsements

Predictions

Results

District 17

The 17th district covers parts of suburban north Austin stretching to rural central and eastern Texas, including Waco and Lufkin. The incumbent is Republican Pete Sessions, who was reelected with 55.9% of the vote in 2020.

Republican primary

Candidates

Nominee
Pete Sessions, incumbent U.S. Representative

Eliminated in primary
Paulette Carson, retired bible studies publisher
Jason "Stormchaser" Nelson, U.S. Army veteran
Rob Rosenberger, businessman

Endorsements

Results

Democratic primary

Candidates

Nominee
Mary Jo Woods, H-E-B employee

Endorsements

Results

General election

Predictions

Results

District 18

The 18th district is based in Downtown Houston and takes in the heavily black areas of Central Houston. The incumbent is Democrat Sheila Jackson Lee, who was reelected with 73.3% of the vote in 2020.

Democratic primary

Candidates

Nominee
Sheila Jackson Lee, incumbent U.S. Representative

Endorsements

Results

Republican primary

Candidates

Nominee
Carmen Maria Montiel, realtor and former Miss Venezuela

Results

General election

Predictions

Results

District 19

The 19th district encompasses rural West Texas, taking in Lubbock and Abilene. The incumbent is Republican Jodey Arrington, who was reelected with 74.8% of the vote in 2020. He is running for reelection against Independent Nathan Lewis of Lubbock.

Republican primary

Candidates

Nominee
Jodey Arrington, incumbent U.S. Representative

Endorsements

Results

General election

Predictions

Results

District 20

The 20th district encompasses downtown San Antonio. The incumbent is Democrat Joaquin Castro, who was reelected with 64.7% of the vote in 2020.

Democratic primary

Candidates

Nominee
 Joaquin Castro, incumbent U.S. Representative

Endorsements

Results

Republican primary

Candidates

Nominee
Kyle Sinclair, healthcare executive and U.S. Army veteran

Results

General election

Predictions

Results

District 21

The 21st district extends from north San Antonio to central and south Austin, taking in rural parts of the Texas Hill Country. The incumbent is Republican Chip Roy, who was elected with 52.0% of the vote in 2020.

Republican primary

Candidates

Nominee
Chip Roy, incumbent U.S. Representative

Eliminated in primary
Michael French, functional analyst and U.S. Army veteran
Robert Lowry, physician and candidate for Texas's 23rd congressional district in 2014
Dana Zavorka, disabilities mobility specialist

Endorsements

Results

Democratic primary

Candidates

Nominee
Claudia Zapata, community activist (previously filed to run in Texas's 35th congressional district)

Eliminated in runoff
Ricardo Villareal, physician and U.S. Army veteran

Eliminated in primary
David Anderson Jr., nonprofit founder (previously filed to run in Texas's 35th congressional district)
Coy Branscum, animal welfare worker
Cherif Gacis, former chairman of the Veteran Affairs Committee for San Marcos
Michael Smith, business owner
Scott Sturm, paramedic

Endorsements

Results

Primary runoff results

General election

Predictions

Results

District 22

The 22nd district encompasses the south-central Greater Houston metropolitan area, including the southern Houston suburbs of Sugar Land, Pearland, and Webster. The incumbent is Republican Troy Nehls, who was elected with 51.5% of the vote in 2020.

Republican primary

Candidates

Nominee
 Troy Nehls, incumbent U.S. Representative

Eliminated in primary
Gregory Thorne, accountant

Endorsements

Results

Democratic primary

Candidates

Nominee
Jamie Kaye Jordan, attorney

Results

General election

Predictions

Results

District 23

The 23rd district covers southwestern Texas, including the Big Bend, the southern and western San Antonio suburbs, and the southwestern El Paso suburbs. The incumbent is Republican Tony Gonzales, who was elected with 50.6% of the vote in 2020.

This district is included on the list of Republican-held seats the Democratic Congressional Campaign Committee is targeting in 2022.

Republican primary

Candidates

Nominee
 Tony Gonzales, incumbent U.S. Representative

Eliminated in primary
Alma Arredondo-Lynch, dentist and rancher
Alia Garcia, motel owner

Endorsements

Results

Democratic primary

Candidates

Nominee
John Lira, policy analyst and U.S. Marine Corps veteran

Eliminated in primary
Priscilla Golden, social worker

Endorsements

Results

General election

Predictions

Polling

Results

District 24

The 24th district encompasses the suburbs north of Fort Worth and Dallas, including Grapevine, Bedford, and Park Cities. The incumbent is Republican Beth Van Duyne, who was elected with 48.8% of the vote in 2020.

This district is included on the list of Republican-held seats the Democratic Congressional Campaign Committee is targeting in 2022. But due to redistricting, the seat became much safer, so it is unlikely that it will be targeted to the same degree.

Republican primary

Candidates

Nominee
 Beth Van Duyne, incumbent U.S. Representative

Eliminated in primary
Nate Weymouth, scientist

Endorsements

Results

Democratic primary

Candidates

Nominee
Jan McDowell, public accountant and perennial candidate

Eliminated in runoff
Derrik Gay, attorney and U.S. Marine Corps veteran

Eliminated in primary
Kathy Fragnoli, attorney and mediator

Withdrawn
Michelle Beckley, state representative from the 65th district (running for Lieutenant Governor)

Endorsements

Results

Primary runoff results

General election

Predictions

Results

District 25

The 25th district runs from Arlington out to rural exurbs of southern Fort Worth such as Granbury. The incumbent is Republican Roger Williams, who was reelected with 55.9% of the vote in 2020.

Republican primary

Candidates

Nominee
 Roger Williams, incumbent U.S. representative

Endorsements

Results

General election

Predictions

Results

District 26

The 26th district is based in the northern portion of the Dallas–Fort Worth metroplex, centering on eastern Denton County. Before redistricting, the district comprised almost all of Denton County and part of Tarrant. In the newly approved map, Denton, the county seat of Denton County, was removed from the district as well as parts of Frisco, to the 13th and 4th congressional district, respectively. Additionally, Cooke County and parts of Wise County were added to the district. With Denton's removal from the district, Lewisville is the district's largest city. The incumbent is Republican Michael C. Burgess, who was reelected with 60.6% of the vote in 2020.

Republican primary

Candidates

Nominee
 Michael Burgess, incumbent U.S. Representative

Eliminated in primary
Brian Brazeal, independent investor
Vincent Gallo, construction contractor
Raven Harrison, businesswoman
Isaac Smith, licensed home inspector

Endorsements

Results

General election

Predictions

Results

District 27

The 27th district stretches across the Coastal Bend, from Corpus Christi up to Bay City. The incumbent is Republican Michael Cloud, who was reelected with 63.1% of the vote in 2020.

Republican primary

Candidates

Nominee
Michael Cloud, incumbent U.S. Representative

Eliminated in primary
Andrew Alvarez, auto dealership consultant
A.J. Louderback, Jackson County Sheriff
Chris Mapp, retail worker
Eric Mireles, oil and gas consultant

Endorsements

Results

Democratic primary

Candidates

Nominee
Maclovio Perez, broadcaster

Eliminated in primary
Victor Melgoza, doctor
Anthony Tristan, financial consultant

Results

General election

Predictions

Results

District 28

The 28th district is based in the Laredo area and stretches north of the Rio Grande Valley into east San Antonio. The incumbent is Democrat Henry Cuellar, who was reelected with 58.3% of the vote in 2020.

This district is included on the list of Democratic-held seats the National Republican Congressional Committee is targeting in 2022.

Democratic primary

Candidates

Nominee
Henry Cuellar, incumbent U.S. Representative

Eliminated in runoff
Jessica Cisneros, attorney and candidate for this seat in 2020

Eliminated in primary
Tannya Benavides, teacher (endorsed Cisneros in runoff)

Endorsements

Polling

Results

Primary runoff results

On the evening of the runoff election, the count had Cuellar leading Cisneros by 177 votes (0.4%). Cuellar's lead increased to 281 votes (0.6%) after provisional and cured ballots were counted. Cisneros filed for a recount on June 7, 2022. The recount confirmed Cuellar's victory by an increased margin of 289 votes.

Republican primary

Candidates

Nominee
Cassy Garcia, former congressional aide

Eliminated in runoff
Sandra Whitten, Sunday school teacher and nominee for this seat in 2020

Eliminated in primary
Ed Cabrera, businessman and rancher
Steven Fowler, combat veteran
Eric Hohman, management analyst
Willie Vasquez Ng, former police detective
Rolando Rodriguez, activist

Endorsements

Results

Results

General election

Predictions

Results

District 29

The 29th district encompasses parts of northern and southeastern Houston, taking in the heavily Latino areas of the city. The incumbent is Democrat Sylvia Garcia, who was elected with 71.1% of the vote in 2020.

Democratic primary

Candidates

Nominee
Sylvia Garcia, incumbent U.S. Representative

Endorsements

Results

Republican primary

Candidates

Nominee
Robert Schafranek, sales associate and perennial candidate

Eliminated in runoff
Julio Garza, insurance executive

Eliminated in primary
Jaimy Blanco, real estate investor
Lulite Ejigu, financial executive

Results

Primary runoff results

General election

Predictions

Results

District 30

The 30th district encompasses Downtown Dallas as well as South Dallas. The incumbent is Democrat Eddie Bernice Johnson, who was reelected with 77.5% of the vote in 2020. In 2019, Johnson announced that she would not seek reelection after her next term.

Democratic primary

Candidates

Nominee
Jasmine Crockett, state representative from District 100 (2021–present)

Eliminated in runoff
Jane Hope Hamilton, former chief of staff for U.S. Representative Marc Veasey

Eliminated in primary
Barbara Mallory Caraway, former state representative and perennial candidate
Arthur Dixon, community organizer
Vonciel Jones, former Dallas city councillor
Jessica Mason, housing administrator and U.S. Navy veteran
Abel Mulugheta, attorney
Roy Williams, former Dallas County constable
Keisha Williams-Lankford, Cedar Hill school board member

Declined
Eddie Bernice Johnson, incumbent U.S. Representative
Eric Johnson, mayor of Dallas

Endorsements

Polling

Results

Primary runoff results

Republican primary

Candidates

Nominee
James Rodgers, job recruiter

Eliminated in runoff
James Harris, retiree

Eliminated in primary
Lizbeth Diaz, paralegal
Kelvin Goodwin-Castillo, mechanic
Kinya Jefferson, self-employed
Angeigh Roc'ellerpitts, minister

Results

Primary runoff results

General election

Predictions

Results

District 31

The 31st district encompasses the exurbs of Austin to Temple, including parts of Williamson and Bell counties. The incumbent is Republican John Carter, who was reelected with 53.4% of the vote in 2020.

Republican primary

Candidates

Nominee
 John Carter, incumbent U.S. Representative

Eliminated in primary
Abhiram Garapati, small business owner and candidate for this seat in 2020
Mike Williams, retired firefighter and candidate for this seat in 2020

Endorsements

Results

Democratic primary

Candidates

General election

Predictions

Results

District 32

The 32nd district covers northern and eastern Dallas and its inner northern suburbs. The incumbent is Democrat Colin Allred, who was reelected with 51.9% of the vote in 2020.

This district is included on the list of Democratic-held seats the National Republican Congressional Committee is targeting in 2022. But due to redistricting, the seat became much safer, so it is unlikely that it will be targeted to the same degree.

Democratic primary

Candidates

Nominee
 Colin Allred, incumbent U.S. Representative

Endorsements

Results

Republican primary

Candidates

Nominee
Antonio Swad, restaurant chain founder

Eliminated in runoff
Justin Webb, financial executive

Eliminated in primary
Nathan Davis, consultant
Darrell Day, businessman
Brad Namdar, businessman
E. E. Okpa, realtor and perennial candidate

Endorsements

Results

Primary runoff results

General election

Predictions

Results

District 33

The 33rd district is in the Dallas–Fort Worth metroplex, encompassing Downtown Fort Worth, western Dallas, and parts of Grand Prairie, Irving, Carrollton, and Farmers Branch. The incumbent is Democrat Marc Veasey, who was reelected with 66.8% of the vote in 2018.

Democratic primary

Candidates

Nominee
 Marc Veasey, incumbent U.S. Representative

Eliminated in primary
Carlos Quintanilla, businessman

Endorsements

Results

Republican primary

Candidates

Nominee
Patrick Gillespie, writer

Eliminated in primary
Robert Glafin, business consultant

Results

General election

Predictions

Results

District 34

The 34th district stretches from McAllen and Brownsville in the Rio Grande Valley, northward along the Gulf Coast. The incumbent is Republican Mayra Flores, who was first elected with 50.9% of the vote in 2022. On March 22, 2021, former incumbent Filemon Vela announced that he would not seek reelection in 2022. On October 26, 2021, Vicente Gonzalez, the representative for Texas's 15th congressional district, announced that he intended to run in the new 34th district after the 15th became more Republican and his residence was put into the 34th.

Republican primary

Candidates

Nominee
Mayra Flores, incumbent U.S. Representative

Eliminated in primary
Juana Cantu-Cabrera, nurse practitioner
Gregory Kunkle, musician
Frank McCaffrey, former broadcast journalist

Results

Democratic primary

Candidates

Nominee
Vicente Gonzalez, incumbent representative for Texas's 15th congressional district

Eliminated in primary
Laura Cisneros, oncologist
Filemon Meza, teacher
Beatriz Reynoso, graphic designer
Osbert Rodriguez Haro, farmer
William Thompson, investor
Diego Zavala, vice principal

Withdrawn
Rochelle Garza, attorney (running for Attorney General)

Declined
 Alex Dominguez, state representative from the 37th district
 Filemon Vela, former U.S. Representative (endorsed Gonzalez)

Endorsements

Results

General election

Predictions

Polling

Results

District 35

The 35th district connects eastern San Antonio to southeastern Austin, through the I-35 corridor. The incumbent is Democrat Lloyd Doggett, who was reelected with 65.4% of the vote in 2020. On October 18, 2021, Doggett announced that he would run for reelection in the new 37th district, leaving the 35th open.

Democratic primary

Candidates

Nominee
Greg Casar, Austin City Councilmember for District 4 (2015–present)

Eliminated in primary
Eddie Rodriguez, State Representative for District 51 (2003–present)
Carla-Joy Sisco, pastor and consultant
Rebecca Viagran, former San Antonio city councilmember

Withdrew
David Anderson Jr., nonprofit executive (running in Texas's 21st congressional district)
Claudia Zapata, community activist (running in Texas's 21st congressional district)

Declined
 Lloyd Doggett, incumbent U.S. representative (running in Texas's 37th congressional district)

Endorsements

Polling

Results

Republican primary

Candidates

Nominee
Dan McQueen, former mayor of Corpus Christi and withdrawn candidate for U.S. Senate of Missouri in 2022

Eliminated in runoff
Michael Rogriguez, household manager

Eliminated in primary
Bill Condict, program scheduler
Jenai Aragona, realtor
Marilyn Jackson, insurance agent
Alejandro Ledezma, construction laborer
Sam Montoya, reporter
Asa Palagi, entrepreneur
Dan Sawatzki, U.S. Air Force veteran
Jennifer Sundt, attorney

Results

Primary runoff results

General election

Predictions

Results

District 36

The 36th district encompasses parts of Southeast Texas, including the Clear Lake region. The incumbent is Republican Brian Babin, who was reelected with 73.6% of the vote in 2020.

Republican primary

Candidates

Nominee
 Brian Babin, incumbent U.S. Representative

Endorsements

Results

Democratic primary

Candidates

Nominee
Marvin Jonathan "Jon" Haire, scientist

Results

General election

Predictions

Results

District 37

The new 37th congressional district is centered on Austin. Incumbent Democrat Lloyd Doggett, who previously represented the 35th district, will run here. He was reelected with 65.4% of the vote in 2020.

Democratic primary

Candidates

Nominee
Lloyd Doggett, incumbent representative

Eliminated in primary
Quinton Beaubouef, graduate student
Donna Imam, computer engineer and nominee for Texas's 31st congressional district in 2020
Chris Jones, traffic camera company director

Declined
Julie Oliver, Democratic nominee for TX-25 in 2018 and 2020

Endorsements

Results

Republican Primary

Candidates

Nominee
Jenny Sharon, caregiver

Eliminated in runoff
Rod Lingsch, pilot

Eliminated in primary
Jeremiah Diacogiannis, business manager

Results

Primary runoff results

General election

Predictions

Results

District 38

The new 38th district is based in the north and northwest Harris County Houston suburbs such as Jersey Village, Cypress, Tomball, Katy, and Klein. This is a new district; there is no incumbent.

Republican primary

Candidates

Nominee
Wesley Hunt, U.S. Army Veteran and nominee for Texas's 7th congressional district in 2020

Eliminated in primary
Philip Covarrubias, former Colorado state representative
Alex Cross, IT Consultant
Jerry Ford Sr., fire chief and business owner
Brett Guillory, educator
David Hogan, minister
Roland Lopez, business consultant
Damien Mockus, small businesses owner
Mark Ramsey, consulting engineer and Texas SREC District 7 representative
Richard Welch, project manager (previously filed to run in Texas's 7th congressional district)

Declined
Dan Crenshaw, incumbent U.S. Representative (running for reelection in Texas's 2nd congressional district)

Polling

Endorsements

Results

Democratic primary

Candidates

Nominee
Duncan Klussmann, consultant and former Spring Branch Independent School District Superintendent

Eliminated in runoff
Diana Martinez Alexander, educator

Eliminated in primary
Centrell Reed, media company owner

Results

Primary runoff results

Independent

Declared 
 Joel Dejean, former electronics design engineer

General Election

Predictions

Results

See also
 Elections in Texas
 Politics of Texas
 Political party strength in Texas
 Texas Democratic Party
 Republican Party of Texas
 Government of Texas
2022 United States House of Representatives elections
2022 Texas gubernatorial election
2022 Texas State Senate election
2022 Texas House of Representatives election
2022 Texas elections

Notes

Partisan clients

References

External links

Official campaign websites for 1st district candidates
Nathaniel Moran (R) for Congress
Jrmar Jefferson (D) for Congress

Official campaign websites for 2nd district candidates
Dan Crenshaw (R) for Congress
Robin Fulford (D) for Congress

Official campaign websites for 3rd district candidates
Keith Self (R) for Congress
Sandeep Srivastava (D) for Congress

Official campaign websites for 4th district candidates
Pat Fallon (R) for Congress
Iro Omere (D) for Congress

Official campaign websites for 5th district candidates
Lance Gooden (R) for Congress
Tartisha Hill (D) for Congress

Official campaign websites for 6th district candidates
Jake Ellzey (R) for Congress

Official campaign websites for 7th district candidates
Lizzie Fletcher (D) for Congress
Johnny Teague (R) for Congress

Official campaign websites for 8th district candidates
Laura Jones (D) for Congress
Morgan Luttrell (R) for Congress

Official campaign websites for 9th district candidates
Al Green (D) for Congress

Official campaign websites for 10th district candidates
Michael McCaul (R) for Congress
Linda Nuno (D) for Congress

Official campaign websites for 11th district candidates
August Pfluger (R) for Congress

Official campaign websites for 12th district candidates
Kay Granger (R) for Congress
Trey Hunt (D) for Congress

Official campaign websites for 13th district candidates
Kathleen Brown (D) for Congress
Ronny Jackson (R) for Congress

Official campaign websites for 14th district candidates
Randy Weber (R) for Congress
Mikal Williams (D) for Congress

Official campaign websites for 15th district candidates
Monica de la Cruz-Hernandez (R) for Congress
Michelle Valejo (D) for Congress

Official campaign websites for 16th district candidates
Irene Armendariz-Jackson (R) for Congress
Veronica Escobar (D) for Congress

Official campaign websites for 17th district candidates
Pete Sessions (R) for Congress
Mary Jo Woods (D) for Congress

Official campaign websites for 18th district candidates
Sheila Jackson Lee (D) for Congress
Carmen Maria Montiel (R) for Congress

Official campaign websites for 19th district candidates
Jodey Arrington (R) for Congress
Nathan Lewis (I) for Congress

Official campaign websites for 20th district candidates
Joaquin Castro (D) for Congress
Kyle Sinclair (R) for Congress

Official campaign websites for 21st district candidates
Chip Roy (R) for Congress
Claudia Zapata (D) for Congress

Official campaign websites for 22nd district candidates
Jamie Kaye Jordan (D) for Congress
Troy Nehls (R) for Congress

Official campaign websites for 23rd district candidates
Tony Gonzales (R) for Congress
John Lira (D) for Congress

Official campaign websites for 24th district candidates
Jan McDowell (D) for Congress
Beth Van Duyne (R) for Congress

Official campaign websites for 26th district candidates
Michael Burgess (R) for Congress
Mike Kolls (L) for Congress

Official campaign websites for 27th district candidates
Michael Cloud (R) for Congress
Maclovio Perez (D) for Congress

Official campaign websites for 28th district candidates
Henry Cuellar (D) for Congress
Cassy Garcia (R) for Congress

Official campaign websites for 29th district candidates
 Sylvia Garcia (D) for Congress

Official campaign websites for 30th district candidates
Jasmine Crockett (D) for Congress
James Rodgers (R) for Congress

Official campaign websites for 32nd district candidates
Colin Allred (D) for Congress
Antonio Swad (R) for Congress

Official campaign websites for 34th district candidates
Mayra Flores (R) for Congress
Vicente Gonzales (D) for Congress

Official campaign websites for 35th district candidates
Greg Casar (D) for Congress
Dan McQueen (R) for Congress

Official campaign websites for 37th district candidates
Lloyd Doggett (D) for Congress
Jenny Sharon (R) for Congress

Official campaign websites for 38th district candidates
Duncan Klussmann (D) for Congress
Joel Dejean (I) for Congress
Wesley Hunt (R) for Congress

Texas
2022
United States House of Representatives